Walnut Corner is an unincorporated community in Phillips County, Arkansas, United States.

References

Unincorporated communities in Phillips County, Arkansas
Unincorporated communities in Arkansas